Dimitri Djollo (born 5 May 1988) is a Dutch footballer who played for Dutch Eerste Divisie club TOP Oss during the 2007–10 seasons. He has since embarked on a career in amateur football.

Club career
Born in Ivory Coast, Djollo came to Holland aged 6 and began playing football with SV Geinoord before signing with FC Utrecht's youth team. Djollo made his professional debut with TOP Oss and after three seasons with the club, he joined GVVV in 2010.

He later played for Sportlust '46 and Sparta Nijkerk and in summer 2015, Djollo left Sparta Nijkerk for fellow amateur side SDC Putten.

References

External links
Voetbal International Profile

1988 births
Living people
People from Nieuwegein
Dutch people of Ivorian descent
Association football forwards
Dutch footballers
TOP Oss players
Eerste Divisie players
GVVV players
Sportlust '46 players
Sparta Nijkerk players
Footballers from Utrecht (province)
SDC Putten players